Labrys wisconsinensis is a facultatively anaerobic bacterium from the family Xanthobacteraceae, which has been isolated from a water sample from the Lake Michigan in Wisconsin in the United States.

References

Further reading

External links
Type strain of Labrys wisconsinensis at BacDive -  the Bacterial Diversity Metadatabase

Hyphomicrobiales
Bacteria described in 2008